FC Slovácká Sparta Spytihněv is a Czech football club located in the village of Spytihněv in the Zlín Region. It currently plays in the fifth tier of Czech football. The club has taken part in the Czech Cup numerous times, reaching the second round in 2011–12.

The club won the regional cup for the Zlin region in 2011, beating Podkopná Lhota in the final.

References

External links
 

Football clubs in the Czech Republic
Association football clubs established in 1927
Zlín Region